San Vicente Partido is a partido in the centre-east of Buenos Aires Province in Argentina.

Settlements
 Alejandro Korn
 Domselaar
 San Vicente

External links

 

 
1864 establishments in Argentina
Partidos of Buenos Aires Province